Safheh may refer to:
 Safheh 2
 Safheh, Ramshir
 Safheh, Shadegan